NGC 6045 is a barred spiral galaxy located about 450 million light-years away in the constellation Hercules. NGC 6045 was discovered by astronomer Lewis Swift on June 27, 1886 and is a member of the Hercules Cluster. It is also a LINER galaxy.

Possible interaction
NGC 6045 is very luminous in both X-ray and infrared light. This high luminosity in both X-ray and infrared has been suggested to be the result of a starburst event in the galaxy. It is thought that starburst events are caused by interactions or mergers with other galaxies. Also, NGC 6045 has a warped disk which may be due to an interaction with the elliptical galaxy NGC 6047 which lies around ~ from the galaxy.

See also
 List of NGC objects (6001–7000)
 Messier 82 
 NGC 6872

References

External links

LINER galaxies
Hercules (constellation)
Interacting galaxies
Barred spiral galaxies
6045
10177
057031
+03-41-088
71
Astronomical objects discovered in 1886
Hercules Cluster
Starburst galaxies